Izz al-Din Abu Muhammad Abd al-Aziz ibn Shaddad ibn Tamim ibn al-Mu'izz ibn Badis (d. after 1186), known as Abu al-Gharib Izz al-Din al-Sanhaji, was a Zirid chronicler. He was a prince of the Zirid dynasty.

Biography 
Abd al-Aziz ibn Shaddad's birth date is not known. He was a member of the zirid dynasty, the grandson of Tamim ibn al-Mu'izz and nephew of Yahya ibn Tamim. He was part of the entourage of the last zirid ruler al-Hasan ibn Ali since he said that he had consulted a book of the library of this sultan. In 1148, the city of al-Mahdiyya was captured by George of Antioch. Ibn Shaddad probably fled the city with al-Hasan to the court of the Almohad caliph Abd al-Mu'min. In 1156-1157, he was at the sicilian city Palermo. He went to Syria, where he settled at Damascus no later than 1175-1176. In this later city he communicated his grandfather Tamim's Diwan to the scholar Imad ad-Din al-Isfahani. He was still there in 1186 as he recorded the testimony of a citizen of al-Mahdiyya on Ifriqya's events the same year.

Works 
Ibn Saddad was the author of a chronicle of Kairouan whose full title was:

 Kitab al-Jam' wa 'l-bayan fi akhbar al-Qayrawan wa fi man fiha wa fi sa'ir bilad al-Maghrib min al-mulukwa 'l-a'yan or Kitab al-Jam' wa 'l-Bayan fi akhbar al-Maghrib wa 'l-Qayrawan()

This work was used as a primary source by Abu'l-Fida, Ibn al-Athir, Ibn Idhari, Ibn Khaldun, Ibn Khallikan, al-Tijani, al-Maqrizi and al-Nuwayri. And the 17th-century historian of Kairouan, Ibn Abi Dinar regretted not using his work.

Another work he wrote was a chronicle of Sicily, both of this works are now lost.

References

Bibliography 

 

 

Zirid dynasty
12th-century Berber people
1180s deaths
12th-century historians of the medieval Islamic world
Berber historians